Preventive repression is repression of political opponents before they actually carry out any activities that would threaten the current political system. The term was used to describe the political methods of the Paraguay caudillo Stroessner, whose methods of "nipping in the bud" the possibilities of any real or imagined unrest were reported at a 1972 Inter-American Defense Board meeting of US and Latin American military.  

Herbert Marcuse, in his work Counterrevolution and Revolt operates with the term  "preventive counterrevolution".

Since then, the term has been used to describe actions of other dictatorships.

References

Political terminology
Persecution
Political repression